Daalder may refer to:

 Dutch rijksdaalder (Empire dollar), worth 48 to 50 stuivers (Dutch shillings)
 Leeuwendaalder (Lion dollar), worth 36 to 42 stuivers
 For the plain daalder (Dutch dollar), worth 30 stuivers i.e. 1½ guilder (or florin), see under rijksdaalder above.

People with the surname
 Ivo Daalder (born 1960), Dutch-American political scientist and government official
 Rene Daalder (1944–2019), Dutch writer and director

See also
 Dalader, a genus of coreid bugs